

Regular season

Season standings

Record vs. opponents

Notable transactions 
 April 1886: Milt Scott was assigned to the Orioles by the Pittsburgh Alleghenys.

Roster

Player stats

Batting

Starters by position 
Note: Pos = Position; G = Games played; AB = At bats; H = Hits; Avg. = Batting average; HR = Home runs; RBI = Runs batted in

Other batters 
Note: G = Games played; AB = At bats; H = Hits; Avg. = Batting average; HR = Home runs; RBI = Runs batted in

Pitching

Starting pitchers 
Note: G = Games pitched; IP = Innings pitched; W = Wins; L = Losses; ERA = Earned run average; SO = Strikeouts

Relief pitchers 
Note: G = Games pitched; W = Wins; L = Losses; SV = Saves; ERA = Earned run average; SO = Strikeouts

Notes

References 
1886 Baltimore Orioles season at Baseball Reference
1886 Baltimore Orioles team page at www.baseball-almanac.com

Baltimore Orioles (1882–1899) seasons
Baltimore Orioles season
Baltimore Orio